Used and Abused may refer to:
 Used & Abused: In Live We Trust, 2005 DVD by In Flames
 Used and Abused (album), 2008 studio album by Danger Radio